Les Anges gardiens (Guardian Angels) is a 1995 French film directed by Jean-Marie Poiré. It was the highest-grossing non-English language film of 1995 with $39.1 million.

Cast and roles
Gérard Depardieu as Antoine Carco (and his 'guardian angels')
Christian Clavier as Father Hervé Tarain (and his 'guardian angels')
Eva Grimaldi as Regina Podium
Yves Rénier as Yvon Radmilo aka. 'la pince'
Eva Herzigová as Tchouk Tchouk Nougat
Jean Champion as Grandfather of Father Tarain
Anna Gaylor as Grandmother of Father Tarain
Dominique Marcas as Mother Angelina
Julien Courbey as Jérôme
Françoise Bertin as Madame Albert
François Morel as The steward
Philippe Nahon as Taxi driver
Armelle as A nurse
Darren Shahlavi as Gangster 2
Mouss Diouf
Fabienne Chaudat

Reception
The film opened at number one at the French box office with a gross of 48.6 million Francs ($9.7 million), the largest opening for a French film in at least the prior five years. It stayed at number one for four weeks.

References

External links

1995 films
Films set in Paris
French crime comedy-drama films
Films directed by Jean-Marie Poiré
1990s French-language films
1990s French films